Alex Mukhanov (born May 17, 1976) is a Ukrainian former professional ice hockey defenceman.

Mukhanov played eight seasons (2004 – 2012) in the Ukrainian Professional Hockey League with six different teams. He represented Ukraine in Pool B of the 1994 World Junior Ice Hockey Championships and in Pool A of the 1995 World Junior Ice Hockey Championships and 1996 World Junior Ice Hockey Championships.

External links
 

1976 births
Living people
Sportspeople from Kyiv
Sokil Kyiv players
Fort Wayne Komets players
Tacoma Sabercats players
Topeka ScareCrows players
Ukrainian ice hockey defencemen